The Pointes de Mourti are a mountain of the Swiss Pennine Alps, overlooking the glacier of Moiry in the canton of Valais. They lie north of the Pointe de Bricola, on the range that separates the valley of Hérens from the valley of Moiry (part of the Anniviers valley).

The (main) eastern summit has an elevation of 3,564 metres while the western summit has an elevation of 3,529 metres.

The closest locality is Salay on the west side of the mountain, although the Pointes du Mourti are usually climbed from the Moiry hut on their eastern side.

References

External links
 Pointes de Mourti on Hikr
 Pointes de Mourti on Summitpost

Mountains of the Alps
Alpine three-thousanders
Mountains of Switzerland
Mountains of Valais